L'Île-Rousse (or , ; ,) is a commune in the Haute-Corse department of France on the island of Corsica.

It was founded in 1758 by Pasquale Paoli to create a port that would not be in the hands of the Genoese (such as Calvi).  As Italian was until 1848 the administrative language of Corsica, the town was originally named Isola Rossa (Red Island) from the eponymous reddish color of a rocky islet that served as a natural harbor.

Along with Saint-Florent, it is one of only two communes in the département to have a French name — all the others have kept their Italian names despite the repeated demands of Corsican nationalists.

History
Inhabited since very ancient times (between 5000-3000  BC), l'Île-Rousse was in 1000 BC a small, prosperous town called Agilla; it was dependent on Tyre in Phoenicia. Destroyed by the Phoenician fleet of Calaris (Galeria), Agilla came under Roman rule as Rubico Rocega (red rock) until the 4th century AD.  Being so close to the sea, it was threatened by pirates and other potential enemies, and was not inhabited for several centuries except for fishermen and peasants who lived on the products of the sea and earth around the villages of Santa Reparata and Monticello.

In the 17th century, merchants from Santa-Reparata-di-Balagna established shops to trade by sea with the coastal villages of the Balagne, Nebbio, and the west of the Cap Corse. About 1759, Pasquale Paoli, who often came to Balagne, decided to equip Corsica with a port in the northwest of the island to try to cut the sea traffic between Genoa and Calvi.  His plans prepared, he persuaded the Balagne government, sitting in Algajola, to authorize him to create a fort protecting the port (the Scalu) on 10 December 1765. L’Île-Rousse was born from this decision.

Climate
L'Île-Rousse has a hot-summer mediterranean climate (Köppen climate classification Csa).

Description
Built on a bay bounded to the northwest by the rocky islets of red porphyry which give it its name, and to the south by an immaculate white sand beach, l’Île-Rousse is presented to the tourist in all its beauty, extending westwards from the sea to the hill of the Sémaphore and the col de Fogata.

The old town of Pascal Paoli, le Père de la Patrie (the Father of the Fatherland), is made up of paved streets, almost rectilinear and oriented north-south.  From the quays of the commercial port installed on 3 of the 6 small islands, the fishing port and the bridges which link the harbor complex to the coast and the market with its twenty one columns, the fortifications and the houses of the old city grew over the years, from 1765 into the first half of the 19th century.

Certain houses with their interior Florentine staircases are remarkable. The first church built in 1740 and destroyed in 1936 gave its name to the rue Notre-Dame. The church dedicated to Notre Dame de Miséricorde is next to an old Franciscan convent, while the parish church of l’Île-Rousse, the Immaculée Conception de Marie, is on the west of the main square, with its enormous date palms (planted 1890) in the shade of which it is good to play a game of pétanque.

The new town blends harmoniously with the old at the place Paoli, shaded by hundred year old plane trees, where it is good to take the summer air. The old town offers visitors the chance to stroll on the old paving stones, partly restored, along streets with historic names: Pasquale Paoli, Napoleon, les frères Arena (Arena brothers), Louis Philippe, Agilla..

Built by Pascal Paoli, equipped by its municipal officials, after 1815 with a blazon decorated with the royal fleur-de-lis of France and run for than a half-century by elected Bonapartist officials, l’Île-Rousse is a town with a share in the history of Corsica. Its contradictions make it an attractive and unexpected place for the tourists who come each year to sit down under the plane trees of its beautiful central square.

Population

Notable people
Pasquale Paoli

See also
Communes of the Haute-Corse department

References

External links

 Official page

Communes of Haute-Corse
Populated places established in 1758
Haute-Corse communes articles needing translation from French Wikipedia
Populated coastal places in France